Osiris is an annual peer-reviewed academic journal covering research in the history of science. George Sarton oversaw the publication of fifteen issues from the establishment of the journal in 1936 until 1968. In 1985, the History of Science Society revived the journal and has published it annually ever since (though no issue appeared in 1991). It is now published by the University of Chicago Press.

History 
Founded in 1936 by a lecturer (and later professor) at Harvard University George Sarton and by the History of Science Society, Osiris is a peer-reviewed, scientific journal dedicated to the history of science, medicine, and technology. It was founded in order to publish longer papers that were unsuitable for its partner publication, Isis.

See also 
Isis
List of history journals
History of science and technology

References

External links 
 

University of Chicago Press academic journals
History of science journals
Publications established in 1936
Annual journals
English-language journals